The Other Wind is a fantasy novel by the American author Ursula K. Le Guin, published by Harcourt in 2001. It is the fifth and final novel set in the fictional archipelago Earthsea. It won the annual World Fantasy Award for Best Novel and was runner up for the Locus Award, Best Fantasy Novel, among other nominations.

The Other Wind is a sequel to Tehanu, the fourth novel, and to "Dragonfly", one story collected in Tales from Earthsea.

Plot 
Alder, a minor village sorcerer who is adept at mending, has been tormented by dreams since the death of his beloved wife Lily. Every time he falls asleep, he is brought to the wall of stones, the border between the world of the living and the Dry Land of the dead. The dead, including Lily, beseech him to be set free. He sought guidance from the masters of the school of wizardry on Roke. The Master Patterner advises him to seek out Ged on the island of Gont. Ged, the ex-Archmage, is powerless as a wizard, but knows more of the world of the dead than anyone living. Alder finds Ged, who is alone at the time, as his Kargish wife Tenar and adopted daughter Tehanu have been summoned to Havnor to counsel King Lebannen. Ged listens to Alder's tale and recommends he go to Havnor to speak to both the king and his family.

Alder sails to Havnor and tells his story. Lebannen is concerned, but has other worries. The king of the Kargs, a warlike people from the East who despise sorcery, has sent his daughter to marry Lebannen as the price for peace between them, a demand that angers Lebannen. Furthermore, dragons have been menacing the islands in the West. Soon after Alder arrives, dragons encroach further east than ever before, finally to Havnor itself. The king and his people ride to deal with them. Tehanu goes with him because she appears to have some kinship with dragons, having as a young girl summoned the great dragon Kalessin, who called her ‘daughter’. She speaks to one of the raiding dragons who delivers a cryptic message, to the effect that the dragons are angry that men have stolen part of their land in the furthest west. The dragons do, however, agree to a truce, and to send an emissary.

The dragon Orm Irian arrives shortly after, taking human form as a young woman to address the king and his council. The legends of the dragons, the mages and the Kargs are retold and compared. It is revealed that dragons and men were once one people, but parted ways. Dragons chose a life of freedom and immortality in the furthest west, while men chose a life of mastery, power and rebirth, promising to give up magic. However, men reneged on their bargain, and the first mages cast spells that stole some of the west from the dragons for men to go to after death, but in their quest for eternal life, they had instead created the Dry Land, an unchanging place where their souls languished forever. The party decide to sail to Roke, the center of the world, to seek a resolution.

The King's party debates with the masters of the great school of magic on what course of action to take. The two groups travel together to the wall of stones, which the dead are attempting in vain to tear down. Alder begins to dislodge a stone. He is soon joined by Tehanu, then the others. When the wall is sufficiently breached, the dead rush out to rejoin the cycle of life, death and rebirth. Tehanu takes on the form of an uncrippled dragon, Alder is reunited with his wife and dies, and the Dry Land is returned to the dragons. After the balance of the world is restored, the king marries the Kargish princess, whom he has come to love and admire, and Tenar returns to Gont and to Ged.

Analysis 

The Other Wind continues the stories of Earthsea characters Lebannen, Tenar, Tehanu, and, in a minor role, Ged, from the previous books. With the exception of Tehanu, these characters are already fully developed, and there is little further development. Tehanu, now a young woman, is still very shy and emotionally dependent upon her adoptive mother, Tenar. Nevertheless, she reluctantly agrees to accompany the King on a mission to meet and parley with the dragons. On their first encounter with one, despite the creature's apparent hostility, and her own particular fear of fire, she rides forward to meet it in the hope that it would recognize and honor her kinship with the eldest dragon Kalessin who called her "daughter" in the book Tehanu. In the denouement of the book, she transforms into dragon form herself, and is thus freed from the burden of the injury inflicted upon her in childhood.

The theme of reconciliation underlies this book. In addition to Tehanu's personal reconciliation with her own nature, the sorcerer Alder is reconciled with his dead wife, Lebannen with his future bride, and through that marriage, a lasting peace with Kargad is forged. The disparate lores of Paln, Roke, and Kargad are each shown to be imperfect reflections of the true history of the world. The spell that created the dry land, which was intended to create an artificial afterlife, is broken, and the land itself returned to the dragons, from whom it had been stolen thousands of years ago. The dead at last gain their release, and the pattern of death and rebirth is reestablished for all.

References

Sources

External links
 
 The Other Wind at Worlds Without End
 A review of The Other Wind

Other Wind, The
Other Wind, The
Sequel novels
American fantasy novels
World Fantasy Award for Best Novel-winning works
Novels by Ursula K. Le Guin